The Hebrew Communists (Komunistim Ivrim) were a short-lived political party in Mandatory Palestine and Israel. The Hebrew Communists were founded in 1945 by some former members of the Palestine Communist Party (PCP), which had split in 1943. The party operated until after Israeli independence in 1948, at which point it merged with the National Liberation League and MAKEI to form Maki.

The party was resurrected during the first Knesset when several of Maki's leaders, including Knesset member Eliezer Preminger, were purged soon after the elections in 1949. Rather than vacate his seat for another Maki member, Preminger remained in the Knesset and reformed the Hebrew Communists on 8 June 1949. The party ceased to exist for a second time on 15 August 1949 when Preminger joined Mapam.

External links 
 Hebrew Communists Knesset website

Political parties established in 1945
Political parties in Mandatory Palestine
Communist parties in Israel
Communist parties in Mandatory Palestine
Political parties disestablished in 1948
Political parties established in 1949
Political parties disestablished in 1949
Defunct political parties in Israel
Jewish political parties
Jewish socialism
1945 establishments in Mandatory Palestine
1949 establishments in Israel
Defunct communist parties
1948 disestablishments in Mandatory Palestine
1949 disestablishments in Israel
Secular Jewish culture in Israel